Michel Herjean (11 December 1943 – 6 October 2022) was a French trade unionist and Breton separatist.

Biography
Herjean participated in the events of May 68 in Brest. He joined  in 1973 and unsuccessfully challenged Socialist Mayor of Brest, in the cantonal elections.

Herjean was arrested in the days following the 1978 Palace of Versailles bombing but was dismissed from the case. He was a member of the Breton Liberation Front from 1974 to 1981 and was known as an explosives maker.

In 1983, Herjean became a founding member of Emgann and served as its secretary for international affairs for several years. He joined  and served as its secretary-general from 1989 to 2003. In 1984, he organized alongside  a network for Basque refugees in Brittany.

Herjean died in Guingamp on 6 October 2022, at the age of 78.

References

1943 births
2022 deaths
French trade unionists
People from Brest, France